Royal Racing Club Tournaisien was a Belgian football club from the city of Tournai, Hainaut from 1909 to 2002.  Its matricule was the n°36.

History
It was founded in 1909 as "Racing Club Tournaisien" and then changed to R.R.C. Tournaisien in 1934.  The club first reached the second division in 1955 and qualified quickly for the first division (in 1958–59).  Relegated at the end of the season, the club then decayed and fell off to the third division in 1970.  In 2002 the Racing Club merged with its neighbour of R.U.S. Tournaisienne to become the R.F.C. Tournai, currently playing in the Tweede Klasse – Belgian Second Division.

External links
 Belgian football clubs history
 RSSSF Archive – 1st and 2nd division final tables

Association football clubs established in 1909
Defunct football clubs in Belgium
Association football clubs disestablished in 2002
1909 establishments in Belgium
2002 disestablishments in Belgium
Organisations based in Belgium with royal patronage
R.R.C. Tournaisien
Belgian Pro League clubs